Sisto Badalocchio Rosa (28 June 1585 – ) was an Italian painter and engraver of the Bolognese School.

Born in Parma, he worked first under Agostino Carracci in Bologna, then Annibale Carracci, in Rome. He worked with Annibale till 1609, then moved back to Parma. His best known work as an engraver was the Raphael's Bible series, which he created together with his fellow student, Giovanni Lanfranco. The images depict a series of frescoes by Raphael's workshop in the Vatican loggia. As a painter, his most important work are the frescoes in the church of San Giovanni Evangelista, Reggio Emilia, which are based on Correggio's earlier works. In this church, he executed the decoration of the dome and pendentives. The dome fresco represents the parousia, i.e. the second coming of Christ, while the pendentives are adorned by the four cardinal virtues. 

Though he often cooperated in fresco painting with Lanfranco, for example in Annibale-designed series the San Diego Chapel in San Giacomo degli Spagnoli (1602–1607) and in Palazzo Costaguti (Nessus and Deianeira), Badalocchio never received the same recognition as his peer. Nevertheless, he is recognized today as an important figure in bringing the artistic styles of the Italian Baroque to northern Italy.

Gallery

References

 

1580s births
1640s deaths
Painters from Parma
Italian engravers
16th-century Italian painters
Italian male painters
17th-century Italian painters
Painters from Bologna
Italian Baroque painters